Pygophora is a genus of flies belonging to the family Muscidae.

The species of this genus are found in Southeastern Asia and Australia.

Species

Pygophora absentiseta 
Pygophora acromiata 
Pygophora africana 
Pygophora apicalis

References

Muscidae